Peremyshlsky District is an administrative and municipal district (raion), one of the twenty-four in Kaluga Oblast, Russia. It is located in the east of the oblast. Its administrative center is the rural locality (a selo) of Peremyshl. Population:  13,952 (2002 Census);  The population of Peremyshl accounts for 25.0% of the district's total population.

References

Notes

Sources

Districts of Kaluga Oblast